Halas is a Yemeni food that is made of halaṣ leaf. The food is eaten during drought periods in Yemen.

The halaṣ leaves have a very bitter taste but they are boiled in water until the taste is gone. It is then added to traditional buttermilk known as ḥaqin.

Ḥalaṣ is often confused with halqa or ghulaf (Cyphostemma digitatum (Forssk.)), which, according to Lisan al-Arab, is a plant that grows in Yemen whose leaves are similar in shape to vine leaves. It is roasted and dried, then used over meat. Halqa is used in traditional Yemeni ethnomedicine.

Etymology
The name of Ḥalaṣ is mentioned in Yemeni poems and proverbs. Proverbs such as

"جاع القوم حتى اكلو الحلص" People have starved until they ate Ḥalaṣ.
"والله لو اكلت الحلص ما تركت هذا الامر" Even if I ate Ḥalaṣ, I will not left it up.

According to Mutahar al-Iryani, a Yemen historian and poet, the term Ḥalaṣ came from the word Ḥalaḏ̣ (ḥlẓ) that is mentioned in ancient Yemeni inscriptions and it means to suffer from starvation, sickness or pain.

Yemen famine
The Yemeni people of Tihamah have been eating halaṣ due to the famine in that area.

References

Yemeni cuisine